Michael Strickland is an American theoretical physicist who received his PhD from Duke University in 1997.  His specialty is the physics of the Quark-Gluon Plasma which is an extreme state of matter which filled the entire Universe until about 10−5 seconds after the Big Bang.  He has contributed to calculation of the quark-gluon plasma (QGP) equation of state, QGP plasma instabilities/thermalization, reformulation of relativistic hydrodynamics for far-from-equilibrium systems, and quarkonium suppression in the QGP, among other things. Michael Strickland is currently a Professor and Chair of the Department of Physics at Kent State University in Kent, Ohio.

References
 Kent State University Biography – https://www.kent.edu/physics/profile/michael-strickland
 Strickland's personal homepage – http://personal.kent.edu/~mstrick6/
 Strickland's CV – http://personal.kent.edu/~mstrick6/cv/cv.pdf

Year of birth missing (living people)
Living people
21st-century American physicists
Theoretical physicists
Duke University alumni
Kent State University faculty